Grindr is a location-based social networking and online dating application targeted towards members of the gay, bisexual, transgender, and queer community.

It was one of the first geosocial apps for gay men when it launched in March 2009 and has since become the largest and most popular gay mobile app in the world. It is available on iOS and Android devices in both free and premium versions (the latter called Grindr XTRA and Grindr Unlimited). As of December 2021, Grindr has approximately 11 million monthly active users.

The app allows members to create a personal profile and use their GPS position to place them on a cascade, where they can browse other profiles sorted by distance and be viewed by nearby and faraway members depending on one's filter settings. Selecting a profile photo in the grid view will display that member's full profile and photos, as well as the option to chat, send a "tap," send pictures, video call, and share one's precise location.

History

Original ownership (2009–2015) 

Grindr was launched as an iOS mobile app on March 25, 2009, by tech entrepreneur Joel Simkhai in Los Angeles, California. The free version displayed 100 profiles of nearby men, while a premium version ($2.99 plus a monthly fee) contained no advertising and broadened the dating pool to 200 guys. Cautious but generally positive reviews of the app circulated through the gay blogosphere on sites such as Queerty and Joe My God. By August 2009, there were 200,000 total users in Grindr's network. By March 2010, there were 500,000.

For its first anniversary on March 25, 2010, Grindr released the app for BlackBerry devices.

In January 2011, Grindr won the iDate Award for Best Mobile Dating App.

On March 7, 2011, Grindr launched the app for Android devices. Along with a free version, users could pay $4.97 for a premium version called Grindr XTRA that featured no banner ads, more profiles to choose from, more "favorites," and push notifications of messages received while the app is running in the background.

In May 2011, Vanity Fair dubbed Grindr the "World's Biggest, Scariest Gay Bar".

In January 2012, a vulnerability in the app's security software enabled hackers to change the profile picture of a small number of primarily Australian Grindr users to explicit images. Grindr subsequently commenced legal action and made software changes that blocked the site responsible.

In January 2012, Grindr won TechCrunch's Crunchies Award for Best Location Application and two iDate Awards for Best Mobile Dating App and Best New Technology. In April 2012, Grindr won the About.com Readers' Choice Award for Best Dating App, after 74 percent of readers chose Grindr over Zoosk, SKOUT, Tagged, Tingle, and Are You Interested. In May 2012, the 2012 Webby Awards named Grindr an Official Honoree in its "Social (Handheld Devices)" category. Fewer than 15% of entries submitted to the Webby Award committee that year received the Official Honoree distinction, which recognizes the best in Internet content, services, and commerce.

On June 18, 2012, Grindr announced that it had officially hit 4 million registered users in 192 countries across the globe.

On July 22, 2012, after Grindr experienced a technical outage, British tabloid The People (now The Sunday People) reported that Grindr's crash was due to the volume of usage upon the arrival of Olympic athletes in London for the 2012 Summer Olympics looking for hook-ups. The report caused rumors to circulate regarding the athletes' potentially scandalous sexual behavior. Grindr quashed the rumors the next day and blamed the outage on technical issues not related to server demand.

In August 2013, Grindr released an updated version of the app requiring users to verify their accounts by providing a valid email address.  Grindr says this was done to reduce spam and improve portability. Critics argued it stripped the app of its anonymity.

On September 30, 2013, Grindr introduced Grindr Tribes, allowing users to identify themselves with a niche group and filter their searches to better find their type. Grindr Tribes include: Bear, Clean-Cut, Daddy, Discreet, Geek, Jock, Leather, Otter, Poz, Rugged, Trans, and Twink.  In addition to Tribes, Grindr users could now filter by Looking For.

As of Grindr's fifth anniversary on March 25, 2014, the app was averaging more than 5 million active monthly users worldwide.

After acquisition (2016–present) 

In January 2016, Grindr announced that it had sold a 60% stake in the company for $93 million to a Chinese video game development firm, Kunlun Tech Co Ltd (formerly Beijing Kunlun Tech Co Ltd). In January 2018, Kunlun purchased the remainder of the company for $152 million.

In March 2018, Grindr introduced a new feature that, if opted into, sends the user a reminder every three to six months to get an HIV test.

In August 2018, the Kunlun executive board granted permission for an initial public offering for Grindr. In March 2019, Kunlun started seeking for a buyer of Grindr after the Committee on Foreign Investment in the United States (CFIUS) had informed Kunlun that having the app owned by a Chinese company posed a national security risk. This also led Kunlun to halt its plans for an IPO for Grindr.

In July 2019, Grindr released Grindr Unlimited, a new premium version of the app that allows subscribers to unsend messages, go Incognito, see unlimited profiles in the cascade, see who has viewed them, see typing status, and use all the premium features of Grindr XTRA. In November 2019, Grindr launched Grindr Web, a free desktop version of the app built for users who prefer to chat from their computer or laptop. Designed for "quick and discreet" chat while at the office, it employs a generic email interface and mimics computer file folders in place of user profiles. This service has since been discontinued.

In March 2020, Kunlun announced that it would sell its 98.59% stake in Grindr to U.S.-based San Vicente Acquisition LLC for $608.5 million. Grindr's senior management and core employees would continue to hold 1.41% of the company's shares after the transaction.

In late 2020, Grindr was reported to have about 13 million monthly users.

In May 2022, Grindr announced it will go public via SPAC.

On November 18, 2022 Grindr went public on the New York Stock Exchange.

Original content 
In March 2021, it was announced that Grindr was stepping into the "original scripted content space" with a debut web series titled Bridesman. The series, created by John Onieal and directed by Julian Buchanan, went into production the same month and made its world premiere at the Outfest Film Festival on August 14, 2021.

The series consists of six episodes and stars Jimmy Fowlie, Sydnee Washington and Shanon DeVido. The show was co-written by John Onieal and Frank Spiro, and produced by Jeremy Truong and Katie White under Truong's company rubbertape.

Grindr for Equality 
In February 2012, Grindr formed Grindr for Equality (G4E), a geotargeted political service designed to raise awareness of LGBT equality issues. Ahead of the 2012 U.S. elections, it encouraged users to register to vote and provided information about pro-LGBT candidates in their areas.

G4E has since evolved into an international LGBTQ health and human rights program. In November 2019, it granted a total of $100,000 to organizations and activists providing direct services and advocacy to the LGBTQ communities in the Middle East and North Africa.

Into 
In August 2017, Grindr launched its own in-house digital magazine, Into, which focuses on queer media and culture. It has been noted for publishing an article in November 2018 criticizing Grindr president Scott Chen for comments he made on marriage equality that have been characterized as homophobic. In January 2019, Grindr laid off the editorial staff of Into, citing a desire to "[shift] our focus to video content".

Censorship 

Grindr is not available in the following territories due to government restrictions: Iran, Crimea, Syria, Pakistan, Cuba, North Korea and Sudan. Furthermore, there are also restrictions in whole or in part in these countries: China, Indonesia, Turkey, Lebanon, Qatar, and the United Arab Emirates.

In December 2019, Grindr took measures to protect users in countries in which they may be at risk for being LGBT, unveiling new security features for them and automatically disabling their distance feature.

Criticism

Offensive speech and actions 

Grindr has been criticized for not taking sufficient action to moderate the display of offensive, racist, and homophobic language by some of its users. In June 2014, when asked about hateful speech on Grindr, the app's creator Joel Simkhai said in an interview with the Israeli newspaper Haaretz that he "didn't like it" but he "[isn't] a sixth grade teacher" and it "[isn't his] job to police such things."

The app was criticized in the past for allowing users to sort users by ethnicity, which some thought was discriminatory. This was removed in June 2020 following social media complaints.

User location triangulation 

In August 2014, it was reported that Grindr's relative distance measurements could facilitate triangulation, thereby pinpointing individual users' near-exact location. A proof of concept was published, and more than 2 million detections were performed within a few days. Authorities in Egypt allegedly used the app to track and arrest gay men. Grindr responded by temporarily disabling distance display globally.

In May 2016, a group of computer scientists from Kyoto University demonstrated how location pinpointing is still possible in the app even when a user is hiding their distance from public display. By exploiting a novel attack model called colluding-trilateration, locating any targeted user becomes a very easy and cheap task without employing any special hacking technique. The attack model works with any location-based service app that shows profiles of nearby users in order of proximity, not just Grindr.

In May 2022, it was reported that Grindr's user location data has been collected and sold through a digital advertising network since 2017, before Grindr curtailed data sharing with its advertising partners in 2020. Historical data from this period may still be obtainable.

User data privacy 

In April 2018, a Norwegian non-profit research organization reported that Grindr's data bundles sold to third-party companies could potentially contain users' sensitive personal information such as HIV status and HIV testing dates. The discovery generated widespread scrutiny of Grindr's privacy practices. In response, Grindr released a statement stating "Grindr has never sold, nor will we ever sell, personally identifiable user information – especially information regarding HIV status or last test date – to third parties or advertisers. As an industry standard practice, Grindr does work with highly-regarded [software] vendors to test and optimize our platform. These vendors are under strict contractual terms that provide for the highest level of confidentiality, data security, and user privacy."

On January 14, 2020, a report was published by the Norwegian Consumer Council which alleged that Grindr had violated the European Union's General Data Privacy Regulation (GDPR) rules. The council asserted that Grindr has sent user data to at least 135 advertisers. The main concerns of the allegations were for sharing personal information, including users' locations and information about their device. These details could potentially indicate the sexual orientation of a user without their consent. After review from the Norwegian Data protection Authority, it was ruled that Grindr was in violation of the GDPR and fined €10 million.

In October 2020, a security researcher discovered a vulnerability in the password reset process. Anyone was able to take over an account using only the email address.

Risk to minors 
Research has estimated that half of sexually active gay and bisexual adolescents use applications like Grindr. Grindr does not verify the age of users, nor are they required to. A loophole in Section 230 of the Communications Decency Act.

In popular culture

Television

Talk shows 

On June 28, 2009 (three months after Grindr's launch), British actor and techie Stephen Fry appeared on the BBC motoring program Top Gear and enthusiastically explained Grindr's intricacies to host Jeremy Clarkson and tried to find another Grindr user in the studio audience. Grindr founder Joel Simkhai later told a media outlet, "The impact [of Stephen Fry's mention] was instant. We had about 10,000 downloads overnight, increasing our base by 50 percent. Within a week we were up to 40,000. Someone once asked me if we paid Stephen Fry to mention us, but we didn't. Apparently one of the guys he works with is gay and showed it to him the week of his appearance." London became Grindr's most active city in the world, and was so until at least late 2012. In February 2013, journalist Jaime Woo called the Top Gear mention one of Grindr's warmest mentions in the media.

In the July 17, 2014 episode of American late-night talk show Conan, host Conan O'Brien and guest Dave Franco create Tinder profiles and O'Brien jokes, "Whenever you don't see me on television, I'm on Grindr."

On February 3, 2015, American actress Mila Kunis appeared on the American late-night talk show Jimmy Kimmel Live and revealed that she has used Grindr at the request of her husband Ashton Kutcher, due to his growing interest in tech investing.

On the February 24, 2015 episode of Conan, host Conan O'Brien and guest Billy Eichner made a Grindr profile for O'Brien. Together they browsed many profiles and sent out messages before ultimately asking one man to meet up in person. They headed out in O'Brien's Cher and Liza Minnelli-themed "Grindr van" and met up with O'Brien's match in a public place. O'Brien closed the segment by thanking Grindr for the new friendship.

In a July 2015 interview, American actor Rob Lowe was asked if he was concerned that people would confuse his upcoming leading role in the legal comedy television series The Grinder for being on the app Grindr. Lowe answered, "It could be a good thing! I'm very current. I'm culturally significant. I could be on the Grindr app."

In November 2015, Lowe appeared on Jimmy Kimmel Live and advertised the Grindr app as "a neat networking app that lets guys who like watching The Grinder meet with other guys in their area who also like watching The Grinder, so they can meet up to watch The Grinder together!" He explained, "You just open the app and scroll through hundreds of men nearby who share your passion for bold network comedy." Lowe quickly found a match in the app and proclaimed "Oh this guy's DTF. So am I! Definite Television Fan," he clarifies. When his new acquaintance arrives in a leather vest and leather shorts, carrying lubricant and a banana, it becomes clear that the two had very different intentions for their evening together. "So," Lowe says, "if you like The Grinder, download the app today, and you, too, can make a new friend."

Scripted shows 

In the March 21, 2013 episode of American musical television series Glee titled "Guilty Pleasures," main character Santana mentions Grindr to lead character Kurt after he says he ordered a "boyfriend pillow" online.

In January 2014, HBO debuted Looking, an American comedy-drama television series that followed the professional and personal lives of three openly gay close friends living in San Francisco, California. The series name is based on a term that originated in online platforms like Grindr to state or ask whether one is cruising for a hookup. Grindr was commonly referenced in the series, which ran for two seasons until its finale on March 22, 2015. In September 2019, The Guardian ranked Looking among the "100 Greatest TV shows of the 21st century".

In the October 23, 2014 episode of American legal thriller television series How to Get Away with Murder, main character Connor (an openly gay intern at a high-profile law firm) uses a gay hookup app called "Humpr" (a sly reference to real-life Grindr) to goad a juror to admit that he is pro-cop in order to get him removed from the jury of a case he is trying.

In February 2016, an episode of the American animated sitcom Family Guy featured main character Peter Griffin joining Grindr to connect with guys to feed him grinder sandwiches through bathroom glory holes.

In October 2016, two separate episodes of How to Get Away with Murder reference Grindr. Connor, the series' openly gay main character, offers a piercing critique of the racism, body shaming, and anti-femme rhetoric prevalent on "Humpr," the show's stand-in for Grindr. In the next episode, Connor has thrown himself fully into Humpr, which he uses shamelessly in his boyfriend's presence. While his colleagues investigate a case they're working on, Connor leaves to go meet two young men for a hookup. He checks both their IDs to confirm they are of legal age before having sex.

In the October 26, 2017 episode of How to Get Away with Murder, Connor turns to Humpr to look for a hookup after his boyfriend lets him down by having to stay at work overtime. Journalist Anthony Gilét wrote of the scene, "After dropping out of law school, losing his job, being disowned by his father for his same-sex relationship, and now feeling disappointment after having to scrap the romantic date he carefully set up for his love, Connor's naturally feeling a little lost—before turning to that accessible little app on his phone. This not only demonstrates how instantaneous sex can be another form of self-destruction, but how we use sex as a coping mechanism, (and effectively, how easy it is to cheat on your boyfriend after a minor dispute)." The Humpr interface is shown on-screen and looks nearly identical to Grindr's. Connor chats with a man on the app about the size of his penis, and minutes later they meet up for sex.

In the October 25, 2017 episode of American teen drama television series Riverdale, openly gay main character Kevin is caught cruising for sex in the woods by two of his friends, Betty and Moose. Betty screams at him that he should have "more respect" for himself, shaming him for his risky lifestyle choices. Kevin yells back, "You act like we've got the same set of options!" and complains that he does not have a way to express his sexual desires. Betty asks, "Can't you just use Grind'em like every other gay guy?" (referencing the real-life Grindr app), and Kevin answers that he hates using Grind'em because people never look the same in person as they do online. Moose, the school's popular hot jock and closeted bisexual who used to hook up with Kevin, sounds off: "Guys like us, in a town like Riverdale, we don't have a lot of options. So, even if something bad could happen, we go for it. Because what if, for 10 minutes, or maybe even just for two minutes, we're not alone?" Journalist Anthony Gilét called the scene "deep" and wrote, "This really highlights how a lot of men within the gay community feel. Loneliness is so unbelievably common, that it's no wonder we meet up with strangers for a brief reenactment of intimacy. And it even highlights why many of us are not as careful as we should be – especially in the height of Grindr-crime – because we're spurred by the fear of loneliness/desire for affection." The scene closes with Betty resolving to snitch to Kevin's dad (the town sheriff) about Kevin's cruising, thus ending their friendship.

Reality shows 

The June 30, 2014 episode of American reality court show Judge Judy involved a case between a 47-year-old plaintiff and a 23-year-old defendant who had met through Grindr. Judge Judy dismissed the lawsuit, ruling that the money given to the defendant was a gift rather than a loan.

In the September 2014 MTV television special Being Tyler Posey, American actor Tyler Posey jokes that he has a Grindr account.

In the April 21, 2015 episode of American reality television series The Real Housewives of New York City, cast member Luann de Lesseps informs fellow cast member Ramona Singer that Singer's estranged husband is active on dating sites. Singer says it does not bother her, but asks Luann, "What's the gay site called?" Luann replies, "Grindr?" Singer then asserts, "Maybe if he was on Grindr, that would bother me." Bravo, the TV network that airs the series, teased viewers with a clip of the exchange to entice them to tune in to the episode.

In a June 2017 interview, openly gay former cast member Milan Christopher of the American reality television series Love & Hip Hop: Hollywood said that he has met guys using Grindr.

In the December 18, 2017 episode of American reality television series Love & Hip Hop: New York, cast member Jonathan makes a catfish Grindr account to catch his boyfriend cheating.

In April to August 2018, a recurring storyline on the third season of American reality television series The Real Housewives of Potomac involved a cast member's husband's alleged extramarital affair with a young man on Grindr.

Films 

In the November 2013 Netflix original comedy Aziz Ansari: Buried Alive, American comedian Aziz Ansari jokes about how Grindr's user-friendly design makes casual sex so accessible for gay men but employing the same mechanism for heterosexual people would make women feel too unsafe for it to work. He says Grindr "might be the most incredible technology that's come out in [his] lifetime."

In the July 2015 American romantic comedy film Trainwreck directed by Judd Apatow and written by Amy Schumer, actor John Cena plays a closeted bisexual character who mentions his use of Grindr when he gets into a verbal altercation with a man in a movie theater. After shouting several comedic gay innuendos at the man, Cena yells, "Fuck you, Tone Loc! You wanna take it to the parking lot? Fine! If you can't find me, I'll be the closest one on Grindr!" and then storms out of the theater.

In the February 2019 American romantic comedy film What Men Want directed by Adam Shankman, actress Taraji P. Henson plays a character who accidentally gains the psychic power to hear men's inner thoughts. Working as the only woman at an otherwise all-male sports marketing company, she especially wields her new power to help advance her career. In one scene, one of her stereotypical "manly man" coworkers debates whether to join Tinder or Grindr.

Music 

American singer Madonna partnered with Grindr to promote her thirteenth studio album Rebel Heart in 2015. A contest was held, and five of the app's users were selected for an exclusive interview with the artist. The contest required re-creating the artwork for Rebel Heart and posting it as a Grindr profile picture. Other winners received signed copies of the album. Joe Stone from The Guardian considered this a "savvy" promotional method, allowing Madonna to connect directly with her gay audience.

In a December 2016 interview, American rapper Eminem joked that he has met people from Grindr for dates.

On January 24, 2020, Eminem took the social media #DollyPartonChallenge and shared a semi-nude picture of himself as his Grindr profile photo. Heterosexual takers of the challenge customarily shared their Tinder profile photo.

On March 30, 2021, transgender singer Amina Banks released a track entitled "Grindr".

Books 
Several books have been published focusing on a variety of topics concerning Grindr; these include the influence of the app on society and how to navigate and use the app.

Sport 
Grindr is the official sponsor of French Top 14 rugby club Biarritz Olympique.

In 2022, Grindr became the sponsor for Travis Shumake, the first ever openly gay man to compete in a National Hot Rod Association drag racing competition.

See also 

 List of LGBT social networking services
 Timeline of online dating services
 Homosocialization
 Tinder
 Blendr
 Spoonr
 Stephen Port, known as The Grindr Killer

References

External links 
 
 Grindr Information from DatingSitesReviews

LGBT social networking services
Same sex online dating
Geosocial networking
Social networking services
Mobile social software
Online dating services
Online dating services of the United States
Online dating applications
Software companies established in 2009
IOS software
Android (operating system) software
BlackBerry software
Gay men's websites
Companies listed on the New York Stock Exchange